Aquilino Edgardo Boyd de la Guardia (March 30, 1921 in Panama – September 4, 2004 in Panama City, Panama) was a Panamanian politician, diplomat and lawyer.

Aquilino Boyd was born in 1921 in Panamá. He married Dora Brin. He studied in La Salle, Panama City, Holy Cross College, US, University de la Habana and University of Panama.

Aquilino Boyd, a member of one of the old ruling families and oligarch, he served as foreign minister of Panama (1956–58), permanent representative to the United Nations (1962–76), member of National Assembly for five terms (1948–52, 1956–60, 1960–64, 1964–68, 1968–69), president of the National Assembly (1949).
 In 1964 he shot newspaper editor Escolastico Calvo after he ran a scathing editorial.

He was one of leaders of the National Patriotic Coalition, in 1959 founded the Third Nationalist Party, after having left the National Patriotic Coalition in a disagreement with then President Ernesto de la Guardia. Boyd led the agitation against the Canal Zone, and delivered the Third Nationalist Party to the National Liberal Party coalition (National Opposition Union) in on the basis of Roberto Francisco Chiari Remón's nationalist stance. Shortly after the election Boyd lost control of the Third Nationalist Party to Gilberto Arias, and founded the Nationalist Party.

Aquilino Boyd was one of the first wave of civilian politicians to make peace with the military dictatorship (1968–1989). In his capacity as a diplomat and foreign minister played a key role in the negotiations that led to the 1977 Panama Canal Treaties.
He served as foreign minister of Panama (1976–77), permanent representative to the United Nations (1985–89, 1997–99), ambassador to the United States (1982–85) and to the United Kingdom (1994–97).

In 1979 he became one of leaders of the Liberal Party. He was the COLINA nominee for second vice-president of Panama in 1989.

Aquilino Boyd died in Panama City on 4 September 2004.

References

Panamanian diplomats
Government ministers of Panama
Foreign Ministers of Panama
Ambassadors of Panama to the United Kingdom
Ambassadors of Panama to the United States
1921 births
2004 deaths
Members of the National Assembly (Panama)
Permanent Representatives of Panama to the United Nations
Panamanian expatriates in the United States